Hostin (also spelled Ostyn, Hostyn and Ostjin) may refer to:

Czech Republic
 Hostín, a village and municipality in the Central Bohemian Region
 Hostín u Vojkovic, a village and municipality in the Central Bohemian Region
 Hostýn, a hill in Moravia
 Hostýn-Vsetín Mountains, a mountain range

Other places
 Hostyn, Texas, United States

People with the surname Hostin
Louis Hostin (1908–1998), French weightlifter
Sunny Hostin (born 1968), American lawyer, journalist, and social commentator